Argelès-Gazost is a commune and a subprefecture of the Hautes-Pyrénées department in southwestern France.

The Pyrénées Animal Park is located in Argelès-Gazost.

Population

See also
Communes of the Hautes-Pyrénées department

References

Communes of Hautes-Pyrénées
Subprefectures in France